Josef M. Planansky (born October 21, 1971) is a former American football tight end who played for the Miami Dolphins of the National Football League (NFL). He played college football at Chadron State College.

References 

1971 births
Living people
American football tight ends
Chadron State Eagles football players
Miami Dolphins players